USNO or Usno, may refer to:

 United States Naval Observatory
 United Sabah National Organisation, a defunct political party in Malaysia
 United Sabah National Organisation (New), a revived political party in Malaysia
 Usno River, a river in Ethiopia